Greene County Tech High School (GCTHS) is a comprehensive public high school located in Paragould, Arkansas, United States. It is one of two public high schools in Greene County, Arkansas, along with cross-town rival Paragould High School, and is the sole high school managed by the Greene County Tech School District. It serves as the main feeder school for Greene County Tech Junior High School.

Within Greene County it serves the southern portion of Paragould and the municipality of Delaplaine. The portion of Paragould in the district makes up . Within Randolph County it serves O Kean. Within Clay County it serves Peach Orchard. It also serves the unincorporated Greene County areas of Beech Grove, Evening Star, Light, Lorado, and Walcott.

History

In 2007 the school district closed Delaplaine High School, the other high school of the school district. Now all areas of the district are assigned to GCTHS.

Academics 
The assumed course of study at Greene County Tech is the Smart Core curriculum developed by the Arkansas Department of Education.  Students are engaged in regular and Advanced Placement (AP) coursework and exams prior to graduation, with the opportunity for qualified students to be named honor graduates based on grade point average and additional coursework above minimum requirements. The school has been accredited by AdvancED since 1969.

Athletics 
The Greene County Tech High School mascot is the golden eagle and the school colors and green and gold.

For 2012–14, the Greene County Tech Golden Eagles participate in the 5A East Conference administered by the Arkansas Activities Association (AAA).  The Golden Eagles compete in interscholastic competition including baseball, basketball (boys/girls), competitive cheer, competitive dance, cross country, football, golf (boys/girls), soccer (boys/girls), softball, swimming and diving (boys/girls), track and field (boys/girls) and volleyball.

 Golf: The girls golf team are 2-time state golf champions (1982, 2009).
 Baseball: The baseball team is one of the most consistent programs in the state with 33 state tournament appearances and wins with 15 state semi-finals. The 1962 squad went undefeated at 16-0 and combined with the 1963 team for 34 consecutive wins, both state records at the time. The 1979 baseball team won 28 consecutive games.
 Cheer: The competitive cheer team won the 2008 state title in the co-ed division.

References

External links 
 

Public high schools in Arkansas
Schools in Greene County, Arkansas
Buildings and structures in Paragould, Arkansas